The following lists events in the year 2023 in South Korea.

Incumbents

Events
12 January - South Korean president Yoon Suk Yeol stated that if the security situation regarding the threat from North Korean nuclear weapons deteriorates further, South Korea would consider building their own nuclear weapons to deterent the North or request that the United States deploy nuclear weapons in South Korea.
19 January - Iran and South Korea summon each other ambassadors in a deepening spat between both countries, after South Korean President Yoon Suk-yeol called Iran "the enemy of the United Arab Emirates" while addressing South Korean troops stationed there.
30 January - South Korea lifted COVID-19 mask mandates up for most indoor spaces.

 3 February - A court in South Korea sentences former Minister of Justice Cho Kuk to two years in prison after convicting him on charges of abuse of power and helping his children enter prestigious schools under fake credentials.
 4 February - Nine sailors are missing after their fishing vessel capsizes off the coast of Sinan County, South Jeolla Province, South Korea. President Yoon Suk-yeol has deployed the coast guard to conduct an air-sea rescue for the missing people.
 20 February - Leader of the People Power Party Chung Jin Suk said that South Korea might need nuclear weapons.
 6 March - South Korea agrees to pay compensation to its citizens who were forced to work in Japanese factories during World War II.
 12 March - Mayor of Seoul Oh Se-hoon called for South Korea to have Nuclear weapons.

Scheduled 
1 to 12 August: 25th World Scout Jamboree

Holidays
As per in the [Presidential Decree No. 28394, 2017. 10. 17., partially amended], the following days are declared holidays in South Korea:
 1 January - New Year's Day
 21 January to 24 January - Korean New Year
 1 March - March 1st Movement Day
 5 May - Children's Day South Korea
 27 May - Buddha's Birthday
 6 June - Memorial Day
 15 August - National Liberation Day
 28 September to 30 September - Chuseok
 3 October - National Foundation Day
 9 October - Hangul Day
 25 December - Christmas Day

Arts and entertainment
 2023 in South Korean music
 List of South Korean films of 2023
 List of 2023 box office number-one films in South Korea

Deaths

 January 5 - Kim Deok-ju, 89, lawyer and judge, chief justice (1990–1993)
 January 19 - Yoon Jeong-hee, 78, actress

References

 
South Korea
South Korea
2020s in South Korea
Years of the 21st century in South Korea